Kočo Dimitrovski (born 13 March 1950 in Skopje, SR Macedonia, SFR Yugoslavia) is a retired Macedonian football player.

External links

1950 births
Living people
Footballers from Skopje
Association football midfielders
Macedonian footballers
FK Vardar players
Macedonian football managers
FK Vardar managers
FK Borec managers